École des Pionniers de Maillardville is a  French first language school located in Port Coquitlam, British Columbia, Canada. It serves the French speaking population of the Metro Vancouver area.

The school was founded in 2000 and is located on the former Terry Fox Secondary School grounds.  It incorporates classes formerly held at Millside Elementary, Como Lake Middle and Centennial Secondary School in Coquitlam. The school now has the IB Diploma Programme in French for grade 11 and 12 students, and has the MYP IB Programme for grade 7 to 10 students.  Not directly affiliated with École des Pionniers, but located within it and often a stepping stone to attending the school, is an independent non-profit francophone preschool called Prématernelle Les p'tits lutins.

In 2013 the provincial government announced plans to build a new $22.8 million facility for the school, which is expected to be completed in January 2018.Construction of a new French school in Port Coquitlam, Richmond News, April 13, 2013. Retrieved 2013-11-07 This has since been completed.

References

External links
http://pionniers.csf.bc.ca/
http://www.achievebc.ca/spt/school.aspx?id=9343092
http://www.lesptitslutins.ca/

Elementary schools in British Columbia
French-language schools in British Columbia
High schools in British Columbia
International Baccalaureate schools in British Columbia
Port Coquitlam
Educational institutions established in 1998
1998 establishments in British Columbia